Pancarana is a comune (municipality) in the province of Pavia in the Italian region Lombardy, located about 45 km south of Milan and about 14 km southwest of Pavia, in the Oltrepò Pavese.

Pancarana borders the following municipalities: Bastida Pancarana, Castelletto di Branduzzo, Cervesina, Mezzana Rabattone, Pizzale, Voghera, Zinasco.

History
Pancarana was a fief of the bishop of Pavia from the 10th to the 18th century.

Demographic evolution

References

External links
 Official website

Cities and towns in Lombardy